Events in the year 2017 in Tunisia.

Incumbents 
 President: Beji Caid Essebsi
 Prime Minister: Youssef Chahed
 President of the Assembly of the Representatives by the People: Mohamed Ennaceur

Events

References

 
Tunisia
2010s in Tunisia
Years of the 21st century in Tunisia
Tunisia